Grégoire Leprince-Ringuet (born 4 December 1987) is a French actor, film director and screenwriter.

Career

Theatre
Between 1998 and 2002, he was a member of the chorus at the Opéra National de Paris.

Film
Leprince-Ringuet has been nominated for César awards on three occasions. He is known for his role in Christophe Honoré's film Les Chansons d'amour and the French-Moroccan War-horror film Djinns. He was also in La Belle Personne as Otto.

He made his debut as director with Fool Moon, a romance drama, which was selected to screen in the Special Screenings section at the 2016 Cannes Film Festival.

Filmography

As actor

As filmmaker

References

External links

 
  Official site

1987 births
French male film actors
French male television actors
French male stage actors
Living people
Actors from Normandy
French film directors
French male screenwriters
French screenwriters
21st-century French male actors